The A388 is an A road in south west England which runs south from Landcross south of Bideford in Devon through Holsworthy, Launceston, Callington to Saltash in Cornwall.

The A388 begins at a junction with the A386 and in Holsworthy has junctions with the A3072. In Launceston it has junctions with the A30 and near Lawhitton a junction with the A384. In Callington it has junctions with the A390 and ends at Saltash when it meets the A38.

Gallery

References

External links

Roads in England
Roads in Cornwall
Transport in Devon